"100 Million" is the second single from Birdman's third studio album, 5 * Stunna. The track features Young Jeezy, Rick Ross and Lil Wayne, and was produced by Cool & Dre. Dre performs the chorus and DJ Khaled performs the intro and outro, but neither of the two are credited. The song discusses what Birdman believes is a major accomplishment: spending 100 million dollars. The song reached number sixty-nine on the Hot R&B/Hip-Hop Songs chart, and number eighteen on the Bubbling Under Hot 100 Singles chart. The song samples Ozzy Osbourne's "Mr. Crowley".

Music video

The song's music video was released on November 23, 2007 and was directed by Gil Green. The music video starts off with Birdman being interviewed by a parole board in a prison. It then introduces some people, such as Birdman and Fat Joe. The video then shows Rick Ross on a boat with his crew loading drugs. It then flicks to Birdman with various red cars. He sings his verse there and then shows Young Jeezy in a car and then that leads to Lil Wayne in a house. The video concludes with DJ Khaled's outro and Birdman saying that what he is going to do is make a lot of money, which is the overall basis of the song and video. The video was premiered on 106 & Park in January 2008.

Charts

References

2007 singles
2007 songs
Birdman (rapper) songs
Cash Money Records singles
DJ Khaled songs
Lil Wayne songs
Music videos directed by Gil Green
Rick Ross songs
Jeezy songs
Cool & Dre songs
Songs written by Lil Wayne
Songs written by Jeezy
Songs written by Rick Ross
Song recordings produced by Cool & Dre
Gangsta rap songs
Songs written by Dre (record producer)